Skjerstad Fjord is a fjord in the municipalities of Bodø, Fauske, and Saltdal in Nordland county, Norway. It is connected to the Saltfjorden by the narrow Saltstraumen strait, which has very strong tidal currents. The villages of Valnesfjord and Rognan and the town of Fauske lie along the shores of the fjord. European route E06 runs along the eastern shore of the fjord, and the Nordland Line follows the eastern and northern shores of the fjord. The Misværfjorden branches off this fjord to the south at the village of Skjerstad.

See also
 List of Norwegian fjords

References

Fjords of Nordland
Bodø
Fauske
Saltdal